Justo Ricardo del Carril Aldao (13 December 1923 – 10 February 2008) was an Argentinian alpine skier and bobsledder who competed in the 1948 Winter Olympics. As a bobsledder he finished twelfth in the 1948 four man competition. As an alpine skier he finished 63rd in the 1948 downhill event. He died in February 2008 at the age of 84.

References

 Wallechinsky, David (1984). "Bobsled". In The Complete Book of the Olympics: 1896-1980. New York: Penguin Books. p. 559.

External links
 

1923 births
2008 deaths
Argentine male alpine skiers
Argentine male bobsledders
Olympic alpine skiers of Argentina
Olympic bobsledders of Argentina
Alpine skiers at the 1948 Winter Olympics
Bobsledders at the 1948 Winter Olympics